The Société typographique de Neuchâtel was a Swiss publishing house and bookseller that operated between 1769-1794. Their archives, consisting of around 25,000 letters and various types of account books held in the Bibliothèque publique et universitaire de Neuchâtel, are an unparalleled source for the study of the eighteenth-century European book trade. The STN published over 220 works, over 500 volumes in total, the majority of which were counterfeit editions. Clients included Jacques Garrigan; Perisse Frères; Rigaud, Pons & Compagnie; and Luke White.

Sources
Simon Burrows, The French Book Trade in Enlightenment Europe II: Enlightenment Bestsellers (Bloomsbury, 2018)
Mark Curran, The French Book Trade in Enlightenment Europe I: Selling Enlightenment (Bloomsbury, 2018)
Robert Darnton, The Forbidden Best-Sellers of Prerevolutionary France (1995)
Robert Darnton & Michel Schlup (eds),Le Rayonnement d'une maison d'édition dans l'Europe des Lumières: la Société typographique de Neuchâtel, 1769-1789 (2005) 
Michel Schlup (ed.), La Société typographique de Neuchâtel, l’édition neuchâteloise au siècle des Lumières, 1769-1789 (2002).

External links
 Archives of the STN
 The French Book Trade in Enlightenment Europe, 1769-1794

References

Companies based in Neuchâtel
Book publishing companies of Switzerland
Publishing companies established in the 1760s
Companies established in 1769
Mass media in Neuchâtel